Amoghavarsha II (ruled 929–930) was a Rashtrakuta ruler. He succeeded his father Indra III upon his death, and was himself assassinated by his brother and successor, Govinda IV.

References

External links
 History of Karnataka, Mr. Arthikaje

930 deaths
Hindu monarchs
10th-century rulers in Asia
Rashtrakuta dynasty
Year of birth unknown